Kenji Sato may refer to:

, Japanese professor in sociology
, Japanese basketball player and coach
, Japanese baseball player